Victoria Santiago Borja (born 1976 in Seville), better known as La Tana, is a Spanish flamenco singer.

Biography
Victoria Santiago Borja was born in Seville in 1976. Her mother, Herminia Borja, is also a singer. She signed with V2 Spain in 2004. La Tana's debut solo album, Tú, ven a mí (2006), was produced by Paco de Lucía. In addition to touring with De Lucia during most summer months across Europe, she has travelled with the companies of Joaquín Cortés and Farruquito.

References

1973 births
Living people
Flamenco singers
People from Seville
21st-century Spanish singers
21st-century Spanish women singers